Gojō Bridge, or   Bridge, is a bridge in Kyoto, Japan, spanning the Kamo River. The current bridge was built in 1959.

The original Gojō Bridge, located somewhat to the north, was known as the site of Minamoto no Yoshitsune's encounter and subsequent duel with Benkei. A sculpture near the current Gojō Bridge depicts the meeting.

References

External links
 

Bridges in Japan